This article contains lists of matches played by the United States men's national water polo team players at the Summer Olympics, and is part of the United States men's Olympic water polo team statistics series. The lists are updated as of March 30, 2020.

Abbreviations

Players with at least one match played at the Olympics
The following table is pre-sorted by number of total matches played (in descending order), edition of the Olympics (in ascending order), name of the player (in ascending order), respectively.

Tony Azevedo is the American water polo player with the most matches played at the Olympic Games.

Historical progression – total matches played 
The following table shows the historical progression of the record of total matches played at the Olympic Games.

Players with at least one match played in an Olympic tournament
The following table is pre-sorted by number of matches played (in descending order), edition of the Olympics (in ascending order), Cap number or name of the player (in ascending order), respectively.

See also
 United States men's Olympic water polo team statistics
 United States men's Olympic water polo team statistics (appearances)
 United States men's Olympic water polo team statistics (scorers)
 United States men's Olympic water polo team statistics (goalkeepers)
 United States men's Olympic water polo team statistics (medalists)
 List of United States men's Olympic water polo team rosters
 United States men's Olympic water polo team results
 United States men's national water polo team

References

External links
 Official website

Men's Olympic statistics 2
Olympic men's statistics 2
United States Olympic men's statistics 2